Filipinas may refer to:

 Women in the Philippines
 Filipinas, letra para la marcha nacional, the Spanish poem by José Palma that eventually became the Filipino national anthem.
 The original Spanish name, and also used in different Philippines languages including Filipino, for the Philippines.
 The plural of "Filipina", a female who is a citizen of the Philippines or is of Filipino descent.
 Filipinas (magazine), a magazine about Filipino-American life
 Filipinas (film), a 2003 film by Filipino director Joel Lamangan
 Compania de Filipinas, flagship of the Philippine Navy
 Moniker of the Philippines women's national football team, which means "Filipino ladies"

See also 
 
 
 Filipino (disambiguation)